Pringi is a village in Viimsi Parish, Harju County in northern Estonia. Pringi has a population of 951 (as of 1 January 2011).

References

Villages in Harju County